WWE, an American professional wrestling promotion based in Stamford, Connecticut, United States, has been promoting events in Saudi Arabia since 2014. After initially holding non-televised house shows, in 2018 WWE announced a 10-year strategic partnership with the General Sports Authority (GSA), which would include the hosting of pay-per-view (PPV) events in Saudi Arabia. WWE announced on November 4, 2019, that it had "expanded" its partnership with the General Authority for Entertainment through 2027, under which it would hold two "large-scale events" in the country per-year. These events have been held at venues in either the capital city of Riyadh, or Jeddah.

The first event in the agreement was Greatest Royal Rumble—a spin-off from WWE's annual Royal Rumble PPV—on April 27, 2018. In November of that year, WWE held a second PPV in Saudi Arabia, Crown Jewel. Beginning in 2019, WWE began to regularly hold two PPVs in Saudi Arabia per-year, with one Super ShowDown event in the first half of the year, and Crown Jewel in late-October or early-November. Due to the COVID-19 pandemic and WWE's suspension of touring, Crown Jewel was not held in 2020, nor was Super ShowDown held in 2021. Crown Jewel would return in 2021, and Super ShowDown was replaced in 2022 by Elimination Chamber—marking the first time that WWE had hosted one of its previously established PPV events in Saudi Arabia.

The partnership has faced criticism over Saudi Arabia's poor human rights record (including its suppression of women's and LGBT rights), the country's use of sport to direct public attention from it, as well as the 2018 assassination of Saudi journalist Jamal Khashoggi. Some WWE performers have declined to participate in the Saudi shows due to objections over the government's policies. Due to the aforementioned restrictions on women's rights, members of WWE's women's division did not perform in the Saudi shows until Crown Jewel in 2019, where Natalya and Lacey Evans participated in WWE's first women's match in the country.

The Wrestling Observer Newsletter gave the relationship between WWE and Saudi Arabia their annual "Most Disgusting Promotional Tactic" award in both 2018 and 2019, the first time in history it has been given twice to the same maneuver. WWE's Saudi shows also took the publication's "Worst Major Wrestling Show" for three consecutive years, including 2018's Crown Jewel, and the 2019 and 2020 Super ShowDown respectively.

History
In December 2013, it was announced that WWE would begin holding shows in Saudi Arabia. In April 2014, WWE held their first house shows in Riyadh. These shows were three separate shows at the Green Halls Stadium. In October 2015, WWE did three house shows from Jeddah, at the King Abdullah Sports City Sports Hall. In November 2016, the WWE again returned to Green Halls Stadium in Riyadh, for two additional live events. The 2016 events were exclusive to the SmackDown brand. In 2017, WWE launched a new Arabic-language television program, WWE Wal3ooha, to target the MENA region (which includes Saudi Arabia).

On March 5, 2018, WWE and the Saudi General Sports Authority advertised the Greatest Royal Rumble, a live event to be held on April 27, 2018, at King Abdullah International Stadium, part of the King Abdullah Sports City, in Jeddah, Saudi Arabia. The event was the first in a 10-year strategic multi-platform partnership between WWE and the Saudi General Sports Authority in support of Saudi Vision 2030, Saudi Arabia's social and economic reform program.

WWE announced on November 4, 2019, that it had "expanded" its partnership with the General Entertainment Authority through 2027, under which it would hold two "large-scale events" in the country per-year.

Controversies

Women's rights

WWE had been criticized for holding the events without female wrestlers, who were unable to perform in Saudi Arabia between 2014 and 2019 due to the limited rights women have in Saudi Arabia. Triple H, WWE's Executive Vice President of Talent, Live Events and Creative, responded to the criticism: "I understand that people are questioning it, but you have to understand that every culture is different and just because you don’t agree with a certain aspect of it, it doesn’t mean it’s not a relevant culture...You can’t dictate to a country or a religion about how they handle things but, having said that, WWE is at the forefront of a women’s evolution in the world and what you can’t do is effect change anywhere by staying away from it....While women are not competing in the event, we have had discussions about that and hope that, in the next few years they will be".

Consistent with the change in law for sporting events in 2017, women are in attendance for the events, though only if accompanied by a male guardian. This was a major change from previous events, which were only open to men. Associated Press noted that this is due to "a series of social changes" by Crown Prince Mohammad bin Salman.

During the Greatest Royal Rumble, WWE aired a promotional video, which included female wrestlers in their ring gear. The Saudi General Sports Authority issued an apology for "indecent material" that aired at the event.

During the second show, Crown Jewel (2018), Renee Young provided commentary at the show. She did the same at 2019's Super ShowDown.

Just hours before Super ShowDown on June 7, 2019, reports emerged that WWE were attempting to add a women's match to the card, which would have seen Alexa Bliss face Natalya. The two women joined WWE personnel for the trip, but the match was ultimately rejected by the Saudi Arabian government.

On October 30, 2019, WWE announced that a match between Natalya and Lacey Evans had been approved for the 2019 Crown Jewel event, making it the first-ever women's match in Saudi Arabia. At the event, Evans wore a full bodysuit instead of her normal ring attire (Natalya's normal ring attire is a full bodysuit) and both wore T-shirts promoting their WWE shirts for sale, due to the country's conservative dress policy. WWE largely celebrated the match as groundbreaking, which they later nominated for a WWE Year-End Award for Moment of the Year, with WWE CBO Stephanie McMahon stating in an interview: "You can either sit on the sidelines and there are plenty of companies and brands that decide to do that or you can be a part of hopefully enacting change. You can be a part of progress. Nothing worthwhile is ever easy. It takes time. It takes perseverance. Now here we are with the first ever women's match in Saudi Arabia. It's pretty mind blowing."

However, reactions from other media outlets were mixed. While some were positive, such as Heavy.com, who stated that the match was "put in place to break barriers and further WWE's 'Women’s Evolution' for the proud ladies in attendance and watching all over the world. And for that, I have to give it the utmost props", or Canoe.com who stated that "The historic match was about and meant so much more [than its result]."  Newsweek called the match part of "Crown Prince Mohammed bin Salman's [intent on] luring major sports event [...] to position the ultra-conservative Islamic country as more liberal and diversify its economy away from depending on the oil industry as part of its Saudi Vision 2030 plan", with Saudi Arabian Amnesty International researcher Dana Ahmed calling the match "a prime example how the Saudi Arabian authorities are using elite sports to try to 'sportswash' their dire human rights record and image internationally". CBS Sports criticized Michael Cole's commentary, pointing out that he was "trying to put over the progressiveness of Saudi Arabia" during the match.

At Super ShowDown in 2020, Bayley defended her SmackDown Women's Championship against Naomi, making it the first time a women's championship was defended in Saudi Arabia.

Killing of Jamal Khashoggi

One month prior to the 2018 edition of Crown Jewel, Saudi Arabia received substantial negative press due to the killing of Jamal Khashoggi at the hands of Saudi agents. This led to the WWE facing calls to cancel the event, with prominent U.S. Democratic and Republican politicians criticizing the company's endeavors in Saudi Arabia. Questions were raised whether because of the position of then-Administrator of the Small Business Administration Linda McMahon, who is the wife of WWE Chairman Vince McMahon and a former WWE executive herself, WWE's endeavors in Saudi Arabia could still be viewed as a strictly private business enterprise. Due to this, Democratic Senator Bob Menendez urged the US government to pressure WWE into canceling the event, while Republican Lindsey Graham, among others, called for WWE to reconsider their business deal with the Saudi kingdom. WWE continued to promote the show, but erased all references to Saudi Arabia as the event's location.

On October 19, the day tickets were to go on sale, the Saudi government confirmed the death of Khashoggi within the consulate and WWE.com removed ticket information from the event page. On October 25, WWE confirmed the event would go on as planned, citing contractual obligations to the General Sports Authority. Speaking with Sky Sports on pushing forward with the event despite the murder, Stephanie McMahon spoke of "an incredibly tough decision, given that heinous act", but said that in the end it was strictly a business decision.

Wrestlers refusing to work
Sami Zayn did not participate in the Greatest Royal Rumble as Zayn is of Syrian descent, and Saudi Arabia has strained relations with Syria. Noam Dar, an Israeli wrestler, of 205 Live has never participated in any of the Saudi events due to the Arab League boycott of Israel and the Arab–Israeli conflict.

During Crown Jewel (2018), Daniel Bryan was scheduled to face AJ Styles for the WWE Championship, but he refused to work the show due to the Khashoggi murder. As a result, his title match was bumped up to the October 30 episode of SmackDown, and he was replaced by Samoa Joe. John Cena, who was scheduled to participate in the WWE World Cup at the event had called it "an honor and a privilege" to compete in Saudi Arabia during the Greatest Royal Rumble, was replaced by Bobby Lashley, as he reportedly refused to work the show in wake of the Khashoggi murder. In February 2019, Fightful reported that prior to his leukemia diagnosis, Roman Reigns had informed Vince McMahon that he also would not be taking part in the Crown Jewel PPV due to the controversy surrounding the event.

In 2019 for Super ShowDown, Kevin Owens and Aleister Black told WWE that they would not travel to Saudi Arabia, in addition to Zayn and Bryan once again not competing on the show. Kevin Owen's refusal to work the show allegedly comes from his friendship with Sami Zayn. As a result of his absence, he was replaced in the WWE Championship match by Dolph Ziggler.

Despite Dar not participating in the Saudi Arabia shows due to the Arab–Israeli conflict, Bill Goldberg and Paul Heyman have worked multiple Saudi Arabia shows without incident despite both being Jewish and in Heyman's case his own mother having been a Holocaust survivor. Goldberg would go on to defend WWE on the shows following his victory over Bobby Lashley at the 2021 Crown Jewel, saying that he feels the country is heading in the right direction in "Westernizing" the country and the Middle East region as a whole, citing the progress just in WWE's shows alone in the Kingdom. Goldberg did, however, later admit on Pat McAfee's podcast that he was initially scared to go to Saudi Arabia due to his strong Jewish heritage, but felt more comfortable after receiving a positive response from the Saudi fans and understood the bigger picture of the shows.

Since Saudi Arabia has strict laws against atheism which is punishable by death, Montel Vontavious Porter (Hassan Assad), who is a former Muslim converted during his prison term, avoided travel to the country for Crown Jewel in 2022.

Travel issues
After Crown Jewel in 2019, a charter flight back to the United States carrying roughly 200 WWE employees (including performers and other staff) was delayed at King Fahd International Airport for multiple hours. WWE and the airline Atlas Air officially stated that the flight had been grounded for mechanical issues, but reports from former WWE Spanish-language commentator Hugo Savinovich and wrestling journalist Dave Meltzer suggested that disputes with the Saudi government over missed payments to WWE for the previous shows were a factor in the delays (including the presence of Saudi military police). 20 WWE employees, including CEO Vince McMahon and 12 wrestlers, booked their own flights back to the United States, while the following night's SmackDown in Buffalo was retooled to primarily feature talent from the women's division and NXT (which did not participate in the event).

Lawsuit
On March 6, 2020, a retirement fund for firefighters filed a lawsuit against WWE in the United States District Court for the Southern District of New York, stemming from concerns related to the fund's holding of WWE stock. According to Forbes, it is "an attempt at class action alleging that WWE defrauded investors via its handling of their deals with the Saudi royal family, who also control OSN, the network that airs WWE programming in Saudi Arabia." The lawsuit claims that the Saudi Arabian government failed to pay WWE millions of dollars owed from their deal with the company, that WWE's failed to disclose said payment issues and that OSN unlawfully terminated a broadcast deal with WWE.

In April 2020, several shareholders and investment firm filed a class action lawsuit against WWE for their alleged ties with Saudi Arabia. As per the portion of the filing, wrestlers were rumored held hostage after the 2019 Crown Jewel event. A statement from the filing read: "[The] Saudi Government was effectively holding a number of WWE wrestlers 'hostage.'" WWE's lawyer,  Jerry McDevitt, denied the claim as a rumor, which was initially spread by former WWE Spanish commentator, Hugo Savinovich.

Live events

House shows

Pay-per-view and livestreaming events

See also

 Sportwashing

References

 
Saudi Arabia
Entertainment events in Saudi Arabia
Professional wrestling controversies
Saudi Arabia–United States relations
Wrestling Observer Newsletter award winners